Al Zahra is a district area of Hawalli Governorate which is located in Kuwait. There are eight blocks in the district, bordered by six districts: Shuhada, Al Sideeq, Al Hateen, Al Khaitan, and Ministries Zone. 360 malls are located at Al Zahra Block 7.

Population 
Al Zahra's population recorded at (1990-6-30) estimates only 70 people in the district. Al Zahra's population recorded for the next 5 years (1995-6-30) estimates 84 people in the districts making the population rise by only 14 newborn people. Al Zahra's population recorded at (2000-6-30) 218 people were born in the district. Al Zahra's population recorded at (2005-6-30) 3,451 population was recorded on district the population soon grew faster and more. Al Zahra's population recorded at (2010-6-30) around 9 thousand people were born in the district (13,003 population). Al Zahra's population recorded at (2015-6-30) around thousand people were born the next 5 years as the population became (24,471) the district became more and more populous.

The Al Zahra's population recorded at (2018-12-31) was 32,064. 10 thousand people of migration and newborn babies are in the district.

Embassies in Al Zahra 
Al Zahra contains many diplomatic embassies including:

References 

 Populated places in Kuwait
Suburbs of Kuwait City